Alexander Erler and Lucas Miedler defeated Santiago González and Andrés Molteni in  the final, 6–3, 7–6(7–1) to win the doubles tennis title at the 2022 Vienna Open. It was both men's second career ATP Tour doubles title, and their second won in their home country of Austria.

Juan Sebastián Cabal and Robert Farah were the defending champions, but lost in the first round to Francisco Cerúndolo and Máximo González.

Seeds

Draw

Draw

Qualifying

Seeds

Qualifiers
  Sander Gillé /  Joran Vliegen

Qualifying draw

References

External links
Main draw
Qualifying draw

Erste Bank Open - Doubles
2022 Doubles
2022 in Austrian tennis